Ken Sugarman (born June 16, 1942) is a former professional Canadian football player with the Canadian Football League's the British Columbia Lions. After playing college football at Whitworth College, Sugarman spent his entire 9-year CFL career as an offensive lineman for the Lions. He was named CFL All-Star in 1970, and was a part of the Lions Grey Cup victory in 1964.

References 

1942 births
Living people
American football offensive linemen
Whitworth Pirates football players
American players of Canadian football
Canadian football offensive linemen
BC Lions players